Stanley James Hallett (October 6, 1930 – November 24, 1998) was an American urban planner and specialist in urban community development who helped seed numerous innovative initiatives and organizations throughout his career. With the bulk of his professional work taking place in Chicago, Hallett began by working in church civil rights and later turned increasingly toward community economic and environmental sustainability. He and colleagues together created Chicago's Center for Neighborhood Technology(CNT), South Shore Bank (later ShoreBank), Northwestern University's Center for Urban Affairs and Policy Research and other institutions. During his career he worked alongside numerous activists, journalists and religious leaders, including Martin Luther King Jr., Saul Alinsky, George McGovern and Studs Terkel.

One of the key concepts that Dr. Hallett would add to urban planning was the idea that there is an 'economy of neighborhoods'; Scott Bernstein, a Hallett disciple and co-founder of the CNT, told an interviewer: "Most economists don't admit to an economy of cities, let alone neighborhoods. Stan saw neighborhoods as a place where money flows in and out."

Early life
Stan Hallett was born in New Hampton, Iowa, on October 6, 1930, one of five children of Reverend Reveley and Stella Hallett. The family moved from town to town in Iowa and finally settled in Rapid City, South Dakota.

During World War II, with many young men serving military duty, Hallett began his church career preaching to a congregation in Wall, South Dakota at age 14. At a Methodist Youth Conference in Clear Lake, Iowa, Hallett roomed with future civil-rights leader James Lawson. The two would room together four consecutive years at this annual weeklong program.

Hallett received his B.A. from Dakota Wesleyan University in 1950. In 1954, he received his Bachelor of Sacred Theology, magna cum laude, from Boston University's School of Theology. He did a photo study on Boston's Roxbury neighborhood and became acquainted with fellow theology student Martin Luther King Jr.  Hallett was influenced by Dean Walter George Muelder, whom Hallett felt "...was way before his time on the status of women in the church, and he had a very strong commitment to dealing with questions of race".

From 1957 to 1959, Hallett served as associate pastor to a church in Newark, N.J. He led a campaign against an industrial park that would displace 10,000 residents. ("You develop a special relationship with people as a pastor... And you get angry at the racism they experience. I began to probe myself at levels I didn't even know were there. I discovered that my perceptions of race were like an onion.")

From 1961 to 1962, Hallett studied urban planning at Harvard University.

The Chicago years
In 1962, Hallett moved to Chicago to take a job as director of research and planning for the Church Federation of Greater Chicago. Church Federation executive director Rev. Edgar Chandler became a mentor; Chandler would later help organize King's Soldier Field rally and would organize a march on the segregated Rainbow Beach, along with Monsignor John Joseph Egan and Rabbi Robert Marx.

At the Urban Training Center for Christian Mission, Hallett taught organizing strategies to civil-rights activists heading south, as he had noticed: 

In 1963, Hallett received his Ph.D. from Boston University. His dissertation was entitled "Ethical Issues in Urban Planning and Development."
He spent that summer in the south, at the invitation of Ed King. Hallett says, "I had another friend from Boston, Ed King, who was a pastor at Tougaloo College in Mississippi. ...Ed told me 16 civil rights workers had been killed—this was the summer of '63—and he felt the news wasn't being reported. ...I said, 'What can I do?' He said, 'The most important thing is for you to come down here. We have to get outside credible sources in here to get the news out.'  I went down and spent a week in Mississippi with Ed. When I came back, I reported it to a meeting of the Church Federation of Greater Chicago. I gave probably the best speech of my life. And then we began to organize a delegation of clergy to go there from northern cities with the purpose of keeping down the violence. The clergy would come back to Detroit or Baltimore, and then there would be an article in the local papers from somebody they trusted. One after another the major metropolitan dailies started to report what was going on. Nicholas von Hoffman was a reporter for the Chicago Daily News. When we were working on desegregating churches in Mississippi, I would talk to Nick every night. Nick would suggest what to do next because he knew what would make the news. And we'd act it out. He was the only reporter I knew who'd help make the news so he could write about it." That year Hallett also worked as a consultant to developer Jim Rouse on the planning and development of Columbia, Maryland.

In 1965, Hallett worked to bring clergy from Chicago and other northern cities to the call of the Civil Rights Movement.  He and other "bishops, rabbis, ministers, priests and nuns felt the call to march in Alabama with Martin Luther King." Hallett was quoted in the Time Magazine article of Friday, April 9, 1965, entitled Churches: The Selma Spirit—"It was a breakthrough into a whole new spirit," he says, "a sense of being part of a community at a level and depth that we've never known before."

In 1968, Hallett's church, the Church of the Holy Covenant on Diversey Street in Chicago, provided lodging for protesters during the Democratic convention.

In 1971, Al Raby, who headed the Coordinating Council of Community Organizations, introduced Hallett to Ron Grzywinski, Milton Davis and Mary Houghton, who would together establish the South Shore Bank's community banking program. He served as a Founding Board Member for the ShoreBank Corporation from 1973 to 1975, and was vice-president of South Shore's holding company in its critical first five years.

In 1973, Hallett led the fight to save the South Shore Country Club.

In 1974, Hallett took a position at Northwestern University's Center for Urban Affairs and Policy Research. The center was one of 16 research centers started by the Ford Foundation in the wake of the 1968 riots. He developed analysis of credit flows and economics in urban neighborhoods. Hallett became an Adjunct Faculty member at the Kellogg School of Management.

In 1976, Hallett was co-founder, along with Scott Bernstein and Dr. John Martin, of the Center for Neighborhood Technology. CNT grew from a project at the Center for Urban Affairs examining appropriate technology for city neighborhoods, initially looking at food production, solar energy and conservation. ("A lot of environmental groups are good at saying, 'Stop, don't do this.' But the question of what we should be doing instead requires that you really take a look at technological development." He served as a Board Member until his death in 1998.

That same year, Hallett joined five colleagues to launch the Chicago-based Woodstock Institute (originally in hearby Woodstock, Illinois), serving as a Founding Board Member until his death in 1998.

In 1978, Hallett became a faculty member at the Garrett-Evangelical Theological Seminary. He taught courses on History of Western Ethics and Political Philosophy, and the Urban Mission of the Church.

Hallett helped lead a coalition of civic organizations in battle against the Deep Tunnel Project. ("You start with the assumption that if a project is that big it must be really well thought through. The more you look, the more you begin to come to the conclusion that any project that big is almost certainly not thought through. You get this great mobilization of business, union, and political forces to do things that make no sense.")

In 1980, Hallett's work helped shape the basis for City Fair, a major alternative technology fair, in Seattle, Wash.

In 1985, Hallett and brother Tom launched Pathfinder Systems, Inc., a personal rapid transit system, to free cities from the enormous toll of the automobile. The concept for Pathfinder would become a consuming, lifelong interest, stating:

In 1986, Mayor Harold Washington appointed Hallett to the board of the Metra commuter rail system, where he served through 1993.

In 1987, Hallett and John L. McKnight co-chaired the Chicago Innovations Forum, providing forums for discussion of evolving urban issues.

From 1995 to 1997, Hallett served on Governor Jim Edgar's Task Force on Human Resources Reform.

In 1998, Hallett launched the Masters program in Community Development at North Park University, a Christian liberal arts university on Chicago's northwest side.

Hallett died on November 24, 1998.

See also
 Asset-Based Community Development
 Community development
 Sustainable development

References

1930 births
1998 deaths
Activists for African-American civil rights
American Methodist clergy
American urban planners
American community activists
20th-century Methodist ministers
People from Chicago
Harvard Graduate School of Design alumni
People from New Hampton, Iowa
People from Rapid City, South Dakota
Garrett–Evangelical Theological Seminary alumni
Dakota Wesleyan University alumni
Boston University School of Theology alumni
20th-century American clergy